Nashville is a city in and the county seat of Berrien County, Georgia, United States. The population was 7,029 at the 2022 census. It is called the "City of Dogwoods", as the tree grows in large numbers around the area.

History

Nashville was founded about 1840. In 1856, Nashville was designated seat of the newly formed Berrien County. It was incorporated as a town in 1892 and as a city in 1900. While some say the city is named after Francis Nash (1742–1777), an officer in the American Revolutionary War, many historical articles in the local newspaper claim otherwise.  The Berrien Press published an article in its November 22, 2006 edition under the title of Will the Naming of Nashville Controversy Ever Be Truly Settled?  The 2006 article pointed to The Griffin Papers, written in the 1930s, and several articles from The Nashville Herald - December 24, 1909, October 14, 1910, January 19, 1933, June 13, 1935, June 29, 1944, October 12, 1950, November 27, 1952, and March 5, 1953.  Every one of these articles, and the 1956 Berrien County Centennial plates all lay claim to Nashville being named after Simon W. Nash, a local citizen of the 1850s and 1860s.

Geography

Demographics

2020 census

As of the 2020 United States census, there were 4,947 people, 2,032 households, and 1,217 families residing in the city.

2000 census
As of the census of 2000, there were 4,697 people, 1,864 households, and 1,213 families residing in the city. The racial makeup of the city was 75.94% White, 21.57% African American, 0.28% Native American, 0.45% Asian, 0.02% Pacific Islander, 0.92% from other races, and 0.83% from two or more races. Hispanic or Latino of any race were 1.58% of the population.

There were 1,864 households, out of which 31.7% had children under the age of 18 living with them, 44.2% were married couples living together, 16.5% had a female householder with no husband present, and 34.9% were non-families. 30.8% of all households were made up of individuals, and 12.3% had someone living alone who was 65 years of age or older. The average household size was 2.44 and the average family size was 3.05.

In the city, the population was spread out, with 27.2% under the age of 18, 8.3% from 18 to 24, 27.5% from 25 to 44, 21.6% from 45 to 64, and 15.4% who were 65 years of age or older. The median age was 36 years. For every 100 females, there were 87.4 males. For every 100 females age 18 and over, there were 84.0 males.

The median income for a household in the city was $26,228, and the median income for a family was $33,320. Males had a median income of $22,725 versus $19,533 for females. The per capita income for the city was $15,007. About 20.6% of families and 25.8% of the population were below the poverty line, including 40.6% of those under age 18 and 15.3% of those age 65 or over.

Education 
Berrien County students in kindergarten to grade twelve are in the Berrien County School District, which consists of two elementary schools, a middle school, a high school, and a charter school.  The district has 172 full-time teachers and over 3,037 students.
Berrien Primary School
Berrien Elementary School
Berrien Middle School
Berrien High School
Berrien Academy

The city of Nashville is served by a public library, the Carrie Dorsey Perry Memorial Library, a part of the Coastal Plain Regional Library System network.

Climate
The climate in this area is characterized by relatively high temperatures and evenly distributed precipitation throughout the year.  According to the Köppen Climate Classification system, Nashville has a humid subtropical climate, abbreviated "Cfa" on climate maps.

References

External links

City of Nashville official website

Cities in Georgia (U.S. state)
Cities in Berrien County, Georgia
County seats in Georgia (U.S. state)